Eriospermum is a genus of tuberous flowering plants. It contains about 80-100 species, native to sub-Saharan Africa.

Name 
The name "Eriospermum" is from the Greek erion for "wool" and sperma for "seed". In the APG III classification system, the genus is placed in the family Asparagaceae, subfamily Nolinoideae (formerly the family Ruscaceae). It was formerly placed in its own family, Eriospermaceae.

Selected speciesPerry, P.L. (1989) Ten more new species of Eriospermum from the Western Cape. Journal of South African Botany 55: 83-102. 

Eriospermum aphyllum
Eriospermum bayeri
Eriospermum bowieanum
Eriospermum breviscapum
Eriospermum capense 
Eriospermum cooperi 
Eriospermum dregei 
Eriospermum exile
Eriospermum graminifolium
Eriospermum lanceifolium
Eriospermum paradoxum
Eriospermum proliferum
Eriospermum pubescens
Eriospermum zeyheri

Gallery

References

 
Flora of Africa
Asparagaceae genera